{{Infobox government cabinet
|cabinet_name = 5th Canadian Ministry5e conseil des ministres du Canada
|cabinet_type= ministry
|cabinet_number = 5th
|jurisdiction = Canada
|flag = Canadian Red Ensign 1868-1921.svg
|flag_border = true
|image = John Thompson.jpg
|date_formed = 5 December 1892
|date_dissolved= 12 December 1894
|government_head_title = Prime Minister
|government_head = John Sparrow David Thompson
|government_head_history =
|state_head_title = Monarch
|state_head = Victoria
|represented_by_title = Governor General
|represented_by = Earl of DerbyMarquess of Aberdeen
|total_number=
|political_party = Liberal-Conservative Party
|legislature_status = <small>Majority</small>
|opposition_party = Liberal Party of Canada
|opposition_leader = Wilfrid Laurier
|election =
|legislature_term = 7th Canadian Parliament
|budget = 
|previous = 4th Canadian Ministry
|successor = 6th Canadian Ministry
}}
The Fifth Canadian Ministry was the cabinet chaired by Prime Minister Sir John Sparrow Thompson.  It governed Canada from 5 December 1892 to 12 December 1894, including only two years in the middle of the 7th Canadian Parliament.  The government was formed by the old Conservative Party of Canada.

Ministers
Prime Minister 
5 December 1892 – 12 December 1894: Sir John Sparrow David Thompson
Minister of Agriculture
5 December 1892 – 7 December 1892: Vacant (John Lowe was acting)
7 December 1892 – 12 December 1894: Auguste-Réal Angers
Minister of Finance
5 December 1892 – 12 December 1894: George Eulas Foster
Receiver General of Canada
5 December 1892 – 12 December 1894: The Minister of Finance (Ex officio)
5 December 1892 – 12 December 1894: George Eulas Foster
Superintendent-General of Indian Affairs
5 December 1892 – 12 December 1894: The Minister of the Interior (Ex officio)
5 December 1892 – 12 December 1894: Thomas Mayne Daly
Minister of the Interior
5 December 1892 – 12 December 1894: Thomas Mayne Daly
Minister of Justice
5 December 1892 – 12 December 1894: Sir John Sparrow David Thompson
Attorney General of Canada
5 December 1892 – 12 December 1894: The Minister of Justice (Ex officio)
5 December 1892 – 12 December 1894: Sir John Sparrow David Thompson
Leader of the Government in the Senate
5 December 1892 – 31 October 1893: Sir John Abbott
31 October 1893 – 12 December 1894: Mackenzie Bowell
Minister of Marine and Fisheries
5 December 1892 – 12 December 1894: Sir Charles Hibbert Tupper
Minister of Militia and Defence
5 December 1892 – 12 December 1894: James Colebrooke Patterson
Postmaster General
5 December 1892 – 12 December 1894: Sir Joseph Philippe René Adolphe Caron
President of the Privy Council
5 December 1892 – 7 December 1892: Sir John Sparrow David Thompson (acting)
7 December 1892 – 12 December 1894: William Bullock Ives
Minister of Public Works
5 December 1892 – 12 December 1894: Joseph-Aldric Ouimet
Minister of Railways and Canals
5 December 1892 – 12 December 1894: John Graham Haggart
Secretary of State of Canada
5 December 1892 – 12 December 1894: John Costigan
Registrar General of Canada
5 December 1892 – 12 December 1894: The Secretary of State of Canada (Ex officio)
5 December 1892 – 12 December 1894: John Costigan
Minister of Trade and Commerce
5 December 1892 – 12 December 1894: Mackenzie Bowell
Minister without Portfolio
5 December 1892 – 12 December 1894: Sir John Carling
5 December 1892 – 12 December 1894: Sir Frank Smith

Offices not of the CabinetController of Customs 5 December 1892 – 12 December 1894: Nathaniel Clarke WallaceController of Inland Revenue 5 December 1892 – 12 December 1894: John Fisher WoodSolicitor General of Canada'''
 5 December 1892 – 12 December 1894: John Joseph Curran

References

Succession

05
1892 establishments in Canada
1894 disestablishments in Canada
Cabinets established in 1892
Cabinets disestablished in 1894
Ministries of Queen Victoria